Stadion Na Chvalech (Stadium on the Chvaly), also known as Stadion SC Xaverov Horní Počernice, is a football stadium in Chvaly, a former village which is a part of Horní Počernice district of Prague, Czech Republic. The stadium holds 3,400 spectators and contains a restaurant. The sports area Na Chvalech also contains a volleyball court, tennis courts, a hotel and offices.

It is the home stadium of SC Xaverov and was being shared with AC Sparta Prague B in 2010. From 2013 up to today, it is shared with SK Slavia Prague B.

In 2010, the stadium hosted a qualification match for the 2011 FIFA Women's World Cup.

References

External links

 Photo gallery and data at Erlebnis-stadion.de
 Images at stadionwelt.de
 https://int.soccerway.com/venues/czech-republic/stadion-na-chvalech/

Football venues in Prague